Digital Project is a computer-aided design (CAD) software application based on CATIA V5 and developed by Gehry Technologies, a technology company owned by the architect Frank Gehry.
Among the changes made by Gehry Technologies to CATIA is a new visual interface suitable for architecture work. With the release of version R5 Digital Project is compatible with CATIA V5R22. 

Digital Project is widely known as the software used to design the Guggenheim Museum Bilbao, completed on time and within budget, and the Louis Vuitton Foundation, which cost ten times original projections and exceeded its schedule.

Digital Project (like CATIA) enables information to be sent directly to manufacturer, rather than needing to be processed separately in preparation for sending out of house.

On their website Gehry Technology list the following functionality in their DigitalProject:Designer product: generative surfaces design, project organization, parametric 3D surfaces, free-style surface modeling (NURBS), design to fabrication, dynamic sectioning, revision tracking and part comparison, advanced solids modeling and integration with Microsoft Project

Digital Project competes as Building information modeling software with products like ArchiCAD and Revit. It has been used on projects such as Sagrada Familia, Guggenheim Museum Bilbao, Ray and Maria Stata Center, Walt Disney Concert Hall and Hejmdal, The Danish Cancer Societies House.

In 2014 Trimble acquired Gehry Technology, the developers of Digital Project.

See also 
Comparison of computer-aided design editors

References

External links 
DigitalProject:Designer product page
Digital Project description at Georgia Tech's website
 has some articles on using Digital Project
 describes the Danish exhibition ”Digital Project – Frank Gehry’s Vision” 

Computer-aided design software
Building information modeling